Doravarisatram mandal is one of the 34 mandals in Tirupati district in the Indian state of Andhra Pradesh. It is a part of Sullurupeta revenue division.

History 
Doravarisatram mandal used to be a part of Nellore district under Gudur revenue division. On 25 June 2013, it was made part of the newly-formed Naidupeta revenue division. On 4 April 2022, the Government of Andhra Pradesh reorganized the districts in the state and the madal was made part of the Tirupati district under Sullurupeta revenue division, both newly-formed.

Biodiversity 
Doravarisatram mandal has brackish water ecosystem. Every year, terrestrial and aquatic birds migrate to Pulicat Lake area for a temporary stay. The ecosystem covers an area of  including parts of the mandal along with Chittamur, Sullurpeta, Tada and Vakadu mandals. The terrestrial birds include painted storks, large egrets, little egrets, grey pelicans, grey herons; water birds include northern pintails, black-winged stilts, northern shovelers, common teal, seagulls, terns, sandpipers, and common coots.

Demographics 

Scheduled Castes and Scheduled Tribes made up 14,520 and 4,191 of the population respectively. It had a sex ratio of 985. It had a literacy rate of 62.43% with 70.08% among males and 54.69% among females.

Administration 
The mandal is administrated as part of Sullurupeta revenue division. As of 2011 census, It comprises the following 45 villages:

 Note: Damaraya Khandrika, K. D. Khandrika, Suragunta Tagelu and Vengamambapuram are uninhabited

Politics 
Chillakur mandal is a part of Sullurpeta Assembly constituency and Tirupati Lok Sabha constituency. , Chillakur mandal had 23,414 eligible voters with 11,491 male voters and 11,923 female voters.

References 

Mandals in Tirupati district